Ridge Munsy (born 9 July 1989) is a Swiss professional footballer who plays as a forward for German  club Hansa Rostock. He is of Congolese descent.

Career
Munsy played for FC Luzern's senior side during the second half of the 2007 season, making seven league appearances before returning to the youth side. He transferred to Lausanne-Sport in July 2010. In 2011, he was transferred to SC Kriens, playing at the club for four years.

In January 2015, Munsy moved to Swiss Super League side FC Thun.

Career statistics

References

External links
 Career history at ASF
 Profile and career history at Swiss Football League
 

1989 births
Living people
Footballers from Kinshasa
Association football forwards
Democratic Republic of the Congo footballers
Democratic Republic of the Congo expatriate footballers
Expatriate footballers in Switzerland
Democratic Republic of the Congo expatriate sportspeople in Switzerland
Expatriate footballers in Germany
Democratic Republic of the Congo expatriate sportspeople in Germany
Expatriate footballers in Turkey
FC Luzern players
FC Lausanne-Sport players
Yverdon-Sport FC players
SC Kriens players
FC Thun players
Grasshopper Club Zürich players
FC Erzgebirge Aue players
Erzurumspor footballers
Würzburger Kickers players
FC Hansa Rostock players
Swiss Super League players
Swiss Challenge League players
2. Bundesliga players
Süper Lig players